Dominik Potocki (c. 1646 – 14 December 1683) was a Polish nobleman of the Potocki family and politician, Treasurer of the Crown Court. He was married to Konstancja Truskolaska, daughter of Mikołaj Truskolaski, chamberlain of Halicz. His son was Jakub Potocki.

References

17th-century Polish people
Polish politicians
1646 births
1683 deaths
Dominik